Zhu Hengjia (1583–1646?) was the 12th Prince of Jingjiang. He was a 10th generation descendant of Zhu Shouqian, 12th descendant of Zhu Xinglong, brother of the Hongwu Emperor. His son was Shitao (born Zhu Ruoji), who was a Chinese landscape painter and poet during the early part of the Qing dynasty. Zhu claimed himself as regent of the Ming dynasty but was later defeated and killed during the Qing conquest of the Ming.

Biography
After Zhu Yousong was defeated, Zhu Hengjia declared himself as Regent (監國) at Guangxi under support of Yang Guowei, General soldiers of Guangxi, officer Gu Yi and the others.

After Qu Shisi knew he arrogated as regent, he ordered the officials of Guangxi not to obey his orders and ordered a general named Chen Bangzhuan to defend him. As Qu Shisi disobeyed Zhu Hengjia, Zhu Hengjia went to Wuzhou to capture Qu and arrest him at Guilin.

At the same time, Zhu Yujian has enthroned as Longwu Emperor and Qu Shisi ordered his men to congratulate Zhu Yujian and requested Zhu Yujian to seize Zhu Hengjia. After Ding Kuichu attacked Wuzhou, Zhu Hengjia escaped to Guilin. Then, Zhu released Qu Shisi and hoped that Qu would help him. However, Qu Shisi captured Zhu. Later, Zhu Hengjia was escorted to Fujian and killed.

Death
There are many different records about Zhu Hengjia's end:
"Hengjia, Yang Guowei and Gu Yi got captured and escorted to Fujian, Yang and Gu got killed and Hengjia died in the prison."
"Hengjia died due to sick."
"Hengjia and Guowei got captured and escorted to Fuzhou, they later got killed"
"The Prince of Tang (Zhu Yujian) demoted Hengjia, the Prince of Jingjiang as commoner. Ding Kuichu escorted Hengjia, Yang Guowei, Gu Yi and Shi Qiwen to the quinsay at Jianning, the Emperor meeting with Prince of Huai and Prince of Chu, they later agreed to do not demoting him and placed him at Lianjiang."

Ancestry

References

1583 births
1646 deaths
Ming dynasty imperial princes